"Joe and Mary" is a rock song written by Bryan Adams and Gretchen Peters, it was released on November 15, 2019, for the new EP called Christmas. On November 25, 2019, following its release on the Christmas EP, Adams released the video for his new song.

Music video
Directed by Adams, the video shows the Canadian rocker reinventing the classic Christmas story of Joseph and Mary, as a classic rock and roll love story, with Jesus' parents fleeing their small town and finding a safe haven for themselves and their unborn child. Set in the streets of Vancouver, aboard a Buick Gran Sport, the role of the pregnant "Mary" is played by singer Kessi Blue, there are three Harley-Davidson motorcycles in the video representing the biblical magi.

Credits and personnel

Song 
 Bryan Adams — lead and backing vocals, piano, drums, guitars, bass, songwriter, producer
 Keith Scott — guitar
 Gretchen Peters — backing vocals, songwriter
 Hayden Watson — recording engineer
 Annie Kennedy — assistant recording engineer

Video 
 Kessi Blue as "Mary" — starring
 Bryan Adams as "Joseph" — starring 
 Bryan Adams — director, producer
 Jo Faloona — producer 
 Evaan Kheraj — DP
 Aidan Farrell at The Farm — colours 
 Badams Music Limited —  production company

References

2019 singles
2019 songs
Bryan Adams songs
Songs written by Bryan Adams
Christmas songs
Songs written by Gretchen Peters